Kabak Mohammad Reza (also Romanized as Kabak Moḩammad Rez̤ā) is a village in Lalar and Katak Rural District, Chelo District, Andika County, Khuzestan Province, Iran. At the 2006 census, its population was 102, in 16 families.

References 

Populated places in Andika County